Bernice Carey (1911 – February 8, 1990) was an American writer of mystery novels, short plays, and articles. Her works of crime fiction, written in the late 1940s to mid-1950s, appeared in English, and some of them were also published in French, Spanish, and Swedish.

Bibliography 
 The Reluctant Murderer (1949)
 The Body on the Sidewalk (1950)
 The Man Who Got Away With It (1950)
 The Beautiful Stranger (1951)
 The Missing Heiress (1952)
 The Three Widows (1952)
 Their Nearest and Dearest (1953)
 The Frightened Widow (1953)
 The Fatal Picnic (1955)

References 

1911 births
1990 deaths
20th-century American women writers
American mystery novelists
Writers from California